Strange Magic is a 2015 American computer-animated jukebox musical fantasy film directed by Gary Rydstrom and produced by Lucasfilm, with feature animation by Lucasfilm Animation and Industrial Light & Magic. The film's screenplay, by Rydstrom, David Berenbaum, and Irene Mecchi, is based on a story by George Lucas  inspired by William Shakespeare's A Midsummer Night's Dream. The film stars Alan Cumming, Evan Rachel Wood, Elijah Kelley, Meredith Anne Bull, Kristin Chenoweth, Maya Rudolph, Sam Palladio and Alfred Molina. The soundtrack consists of numerous pop songs spanning several decades.

Lucas had been working on developing the project for 15 years before production began. This was his first writing credit since the 1994 film Radioland Murders not to be associated with the Star Wars or Indiana Jones franchises.

The film was released in the United States on January 23, 2015 by Touchstone Pictures, making it the first Lucasfilm production to be distributed by Walt Disney Studios Motion Pictures, following their parent company's acquisition of the studio on December 21, 2012. The film was panned by critics, who criticised its script, humor and songs but praised its animation, and was a box-office bomb, grossing $13.6 million worldwide and losing around $40–50 million. This is, to date, the only Lucasfilm Animation production not to be part of the Star Wars franchise.

Plot
When fairy princess Marianne sees her fiancé, Roland, kissing another fairy on their wedding day, she vows never to fall in love again. In the Dark Forest, the Bog King has the same view on love, despite his caring mother Griselda's protests.

Marianne's sister, Dawn, and her elf friend, Sunny, are nearly devoured by a giant lizard before Marianne rescues them. After falling through the border and into the Dark Forest, Sunny finds a primrose petal and hides it. At the Spring Ball, Roland tries to win back Marianne, who angrily drives him away. Roland consults his warriors, who jokingly tell him to procure the love potion to woo Marianne. Roland then encounters Sunny, who has an unrequited love for Dawn. He convinces Sunny to venture into the Dark Forest to get the love potion, which they would both use on their respective fairies. Sunny goes back and finds the hidden primrose petal and, with the guidance of an Imp, travels to the Bog King's lair, where the Sugar Plum Fairy was being held prisoner by the Bog King. Sunny finds the Sugar Plum Fairy, who agrees to make the love potion if Sunny promises to set her free.

Plum's escape rouses Bog King, who recaptures her while Sunny and the Imp escape. Sunny returns to the ball and tries to hit Dawn with the love potion. Bog interrupts the celebrations and captures Dawn just as she is sprayed by the love potion and the imp steals it in order to spread it throughout the forest. Bog orders them to deliver the potion to him by moon-down or he will harm Dawn. Defying her father's order, Marianne flies off after her sister while he grants Roland a small army to head off on foot to Bog's castle.

Dawn falls in love with Bog due to the potion, and Bog has her imprisoned for his own sanity. Marianne arrives and fights with Bog to return her sister. When she realizes the severity of the situation, the two of them begin to find common interests. When they consult Sugar Plum for an antidote, she explains that true love will negate the effects of the potion. A mutual attraction begins to develop between Marianne and Bog, but only Griselda sees it.

Sunny recovers the potion from the imp and gives it to Roland as they march on to the castle. Bog sees this and suspects that Marianne had set him up, breaking his heart again as he leaves her stranded in a spider web. She escapes and joins in the battle taking place at the castle. Sunny frees Sugar Plum, Dawn, and the love-stricken forest creatures that the imp had hit with the love potion.

In the escape, Bog holds the mouth of his den open long enough for everyone to escape. He survives, to Marianne's relief, and Sunny reveals his true feelings to Dawn, and they kiss. Bog and Marianne finally admit their feelings for each other and kiss.

Cast

 Alan Cumming as Bog King
 Evan Rachel Wood as Marianne
 Kristin Chenoweth as Sugar Plum Fairy
 Maya Rudolph as Griselda
 Alfred Molina as the Fairy King
 Elijah Kelley as Sunny
 Meredith Anne Bull as Dawn
 Sam Palladio as Roland
 Bob Einstein as Stuff
 Peter Stormare as Thang
 Kevin Michael Richardson as Brutus
 Llou Johnson as Pare
 Robbie Daymond as Fairy Cronies
 Brenda Chapman as Imp
 Tony Cox as Plum Elf
 Gary Rydstrom as Angry Gus

Production
George Lucas had long wanted to make a film for his three daughters, with the original idea for the movie being generated 15 years prior. He described the film as Star Wars for a female audience stating "Star Wars was for 12-year-old boys; I figured I'd make one for 12-year-old girls." On the film's plot, director Gary Rydstrom stated, "We pitched it as a Beauty and the Beast story where the Beast doesn't change." According to Rydstrom, Lucas "really wanted to make a beautiful fairy tale with goblins and elves, and do it in a way that only this company can do. He had been working on it for a long time." Rydstrom mentioned that Lucas emphasized that the story should be about "finding beauty in strange places". Rydstrom also stated "It was important for him to tell this story where you saw the beauty in something you didn't expect to see—that it looked ugly on the outside but you saw the beauty underneath." The film was in the works for 15 years including, at one point development alongside the Star Wars prequels. Before The Walt Disney Company acquired Lucasfilm in late 2012, production on Strange Magic was already well underway. Rydstrom and his crew screened the film for Disney executives. Rydstrom stated, "We're not Pixar or Disney Animation, so in some ways George was our John [Lasseter] on this one ... I like the fact—not that I don't like advice from all over—but this is our own thing, this is a Lucasfilm project ... I remember when Labyrinth came out and how exciting that was. There was a magic to that, this has the same vibe to me."

One of the biggest inspirations for the film's soundtrack was another Lucasfilm production, American Graffiti (1973). For Strange Magic, Lucas revealed: "I had a lot of Beatles songs in there originally, but we couldn't afford them." Many of the songs that did make it into the film were tweaked to help tell the story such as "Bad Romance", which became a march for an invading army, and "I'll Never Fall in Love Again", which was made into a warrior anthem for Marianne. According to Lucas, the main message of the film is that "A real relationship rests in a much deeper place, where you love somebody and you've thought through it carefully as you've been carrying on conversations and doing things. You fall in love with their mind and everything else more than just the way they look." At one point during production the crew experimented with the idea of having the entirety of the dialogue sung.

The hair design of sisters Marianne and Dawn went through several revisions. According to Meredith Anne Bull, the voice of Dawn, "[The sisters'] hair has changed a lot since the beginning, we used to have long, brown hair. It was red for a while and now it has ended up short and blonde! ... There's a lot of work that goes into creating the hair of an animated character. There are actually groups of people where that's their only job, to do the animation of hair! That was really cool, learning that." On the subject of voice recording, Bull stated, "There's just a lot of really cool stuff [that our director] would show us—tricks and stuff to do when we were recording: Special effects with our mouths, or by chewing stuff. One time I watched Peter Stormare chew an entire pack of gum while he was trying to record!" Bull also noted that while recording she did not have many visuals to reference, "For the first year of production, I really had no idea, sometimes they would have drawings, but other than that I just had to use my imagination of what was going on!"

Music

The film's soundtrack includes cast performances of new versions of pop and classic rock songs which were chosen for the film by George Lucas. The soundtrack was released by Buena Vista Records on January 20, 2015, followed by a physical release on February 17, 2015.

Additionally, there are songs used in the film, but not in the album. An instrumental of "People Are Strange" can be heard during the mushrooms' first spread messages through the bog forest, and the chorus from "Bad Romance" is used as a march for an invading army.

Release
Strange Magic was released by Walt Disney Studios Motion Pictures through its Touchstone Pictures banner on January 23, 2015. A trailer for the film was released on November 21, 2014.

Home media 
Strange Magic was released by Touchstone Home Entertainment on DVD and digital on May 19, 2015.

Reception

Box office
In its opening weekend, Strange Magic opened at #7 and grossed $5.5 million. It had the lowest ticket sales of any animated film released in over 3,000 theatres. The previous animated films with lowest opening weekend gross were The Wild Thornberrys Movie (2002) and Quest for Camelot (1998). The film closed on April 16, 2015 and had earned $12,429,583 in the domestic box office, with $1,173,870 overseas for a worldwide total of $13,603,453.

Critical response 
The website's critical consensus states, "Like most modern animated movies, Strange Magic is lovely to look at; unfortunately, there isn't much going on beneath the surface." On Metacritic, the film has a score of 25 out of 100, based on 20 critics, indicating "generally unfavorable reviews". Audiences polled by CinemaScore gave the film a grade of "B−" on an A+ to F scale.

Alonso Duralde of The Wrap gave a negative review, writing "That terrible character design, combined with a painful lack of laughs and a crushing plethora of ghastly songs, makes Strange Magic perhaps the worst animated feature ever to come out of Disney." Conversely, Drew Taylor of Indiewire gave the film a B−, stating in his review "Strange Magic does manage to enchant you (mostly) with its oddball charm." Justin Chang of Variety gave the film a negative review, saying "This noisy, unappealing children's fantasy fails to distinguish itself among January's many, many reasons to steer clear of the multiplex." Alan Scherstuhl of The Village Voice described Strange Magic as "the best Lucas film in 25 years: funny, idiosyncratic, hippy-dippy, packed with creatures and visions worth beholding." Michael Rechtshaffen of The Hollywood Reporter called the film "A shrill, garish hodgepodge of familiar elements from other animated vehicles (most evidently 2013's Epic), there's virtually nothing about this forced, fractured fairy tale that feels remotely fresh or involving." Michael Ordoña of the San Francisco Chronicle gave the film one out of four stars, saying "The plot movement feels very much like an unpleasant formality, shoved forward by tiresome devices." Claudia Puig of USA Today gave the film two out of four stars, saying "Strange Magic is strange all right, but hardly magical." Jesse Hassenger of The A.V. Club gave the film a B, saying "The movie maintains its own level of oddball invention that at least feels pleasantly removed from the grind of big-studio cartoon manufacturing." Rafer Guzman of Newsday gave the film one out of four stars, saying "A noxious cauldron of ingredients that shouldn't have been mixed: fairies, Shakespeare and classic rock."

Lou Lumenick of the New York Post gave the film one out of four stars, saying "If Lucasfilm had bought Disney instead of the other way around, the smash hit Frozen might have turned out like Strange Magic, a jaw-droppingly terrible animated musical that mismatches George Lucas' inane story about a pair of fairy princesses to an oddball selection of the Star Wars creator's favorite pop tunes." Betsy Sharkey of the Los Angeles Times gave the film a negative review, saying "Strange Magic, the new animated musical fairy tale from the mind and the mixtape of George Lucas, is indeed strange. What's missing is the magic." Ben Kenigsberg of The New York Times gave the film a negative review, saying "Said to be inspired by A Midsummer Night's Dream, the film plays more like Avatar scored to a karaoke competition." Bilge Ebiri of New York magazine gave the film a negative review, saying "The problem with Strange Magic isn't so much its derivative story as it is the odd, half-complete way it unfolds. You can sense the weird mixture of tones, influences, ideas—as if the whole thing were still in its planning stages." Glenn Kenny of RogerEbert.com gave the film one and a half stars out of four, saying "Strange Magic is essentially a jukebox musical so song-laden as to practically be an operetta, and the songs are so eclectic that they never quite fit into the movie's flying-insect world, which is divided into dark and light forests." Keith Phipps of The Dissolve gave the film one and a half stars out of five, saying "Strange Magic certainly isn't an ordinary sort of mess, and the personal nature of the project is still evident in the finished film."

References

External links

  at 
 
 
 
 

2015 films
2015 animated films
2015 comedy films
2015 computer-animated films
2015 directorial debut films
2010s American animated films
2010s fantasy comedy films
2010s musical comedy films
2010s musical fantasy films
American animated fantasy films
American fantasy comedy films
American musical comedy films
American musical fantasy films
Animated films about magic
Animated musical films
2010s English-language films
Films about elves
Films about fairies and sprites
Films about potions
Films based on A Midsummer Night's Dream
Films directed by Gary Rydstrom
Films scored by Marius de Vries
Films with screenplays by George Lucas
Films with screenplays by Irene Mecchi
Goblin films
Jukebox musical films
Lucasfilm animated films
Lucasfilm films
Touchstone Pictures animated films
American children's animated fantasy films
American children's animated musical films